The Eastern and Western Divisions of the National Football League, renamed the American and National Conferences in 1950 and then the Eastern and Western Conferences in 1953, were organized as a result of the disputed NFL championship of 1932.  NFL owners agreed that henceforth there would be an annual championship game, to be played between the teams with the best records from two divisions, Eastern and Western. The two-division/conference structure remained essentially stable for over 35 years, including the absorption of former All-America Football Conference teams in 1950, and the early expansion teams added in the 1960s in response to the American Football League. With the 1970 AFL–NFL merger the new, larger league was reorganized.

Teams

1933–1949

1950–1966

1967–1969

Champions

1933–1966

1967–1969

References

History of the National Football League